Southern or South Sámi is the southwesternmost of the Sámi languages, and is spoken in Norway and Sweden. It is an endangered language; the strongholds of this language are the municipalities of Snåsa, Røyrvik, Røros (Trøndelag, Central Norway) and Hattfjelldal (Nordland, Northern Norway) in Norway.

It is possible to study Southern Sámi at Nord University in Levanger, Umeå University in Umeå, and Uppsala University in Uppsala. In 2018, two master's degrees were written in the language at Umeå University. Language courses are also offered in different Sámi language centres throughout the south Sámi area.

Writing system
Southern Sámi is one of the six Sámi languages that has an official written standard, but only a few books have been published for the language, one of which is an adequate-sized Southern Sámi–Norwegian dictionary.

Southern Sámi uses the Latin alphabet:

The Sámi Language Council recommended in 1976 to use ⟨æ⟩ and ⟨ö⟩, but in practice the latter is replaced by ⟨ø⟩ in Norway and the former by ⟨ä⟩ in Sweden. This is in accordance with the usage in Norwegian and Swedish, based on computer or typewriter availability.

Phonology

Southern Sámi has two dialects, the northern and the southern dialect. The phonological differences between the dialects are relatively small; the phonemic system of the northern dialect is explained below.

Vowels

The vowel phonemes of the northern dialect are the following; orthographic counterparts are given in italics:

High vowels only occur as short.

The vowels may combine to form ten different diphthongs:

Consonants

Grammar

Sound alternations 

In Southern Sámi, the vowel in the second syllable of a word causes changes to the vowel in the first syllable, a feature called umlaut. The vowel in the second syllable can change depending on the inflectional ending being attached, and the vowel in the first vowel will likewise alternate accordingly. Often there are three different vowels that alternate with each other in the paradigm of a single word, for example as follows:

  ~  ~ :  'to walk' :  'I walk' :  'I walked'
  ~  ~ :  'to leave' :  'I leave' :  'I left'

The following table gives a full overview of the alternations:

On the other hand, Southern Sami is the only Sami language that does not have consonant gradation. Hence consonants in the middle of words never alternate in Southern Sami, even though such alternations are frequent in other Sami languages. Compare, for instance, Southern Sami  'name' :  'in the name' to Northern Sami  : , with the consonant gradation  : .

Cases 

Southern Sami has 8 cases:

Verbs

Person

Southern Sámi verbs conjugate for three grammatical persons:

first person
second person
third person

Mood

Tense

Grammatical number

Southern Sámi verbs conjugate for three grammatical numbers:

singular
dual
plural

Negative verb

Southern Sámi, like Finnish, the other Sámi languages, and Estonian, has a negative verb. In Southern Sámi, the negative verb conjugates according to tense (past and non-past), mood (indicative and imperative), person (1st, 2nd and 3rd) and number (singular, dual and plural). This differs from some other Sámi languages, e.g. from Northern Sámi, which do not conjugate according to tense.

Syntax

Like Skolt Sámi and unlike other Sámi languages, Southern Sámi is an SOV language.

References

 Bergsland, Knut. Røroslappisk grammatikk, 1946.
 Jussi Ylikoski. South Saami, 2022.
 Knut Bergsland. Sydsamisk grammatikk, 1982.
 Knut Bergsland and Lajla Mattson Magga. Åarjelsaemien-daaroen baakoegærja, 1993.
 Hasselbrink, Gustav. Südsamisches Wörterbuch I–III

External links

The Children's TV series Binnabánnaš in Southern Sámi
Sámi lottit Names of birds found in Sápmi in a number of languages, including Skolt Sámi and English. Search function only works with Finnish input though.
Southern Sámi grammatical resources
Samien Sijte – Southern Sámi Museum and Cultural Center
Sørsamisk forskning og undervisning – Universitetet i Tromsø

Western Sámi languages
Languages of Norway
 
Subject–object–verb languages
Languages of Sweden
Endangered Uralic languages
Endangered languages of Europe